Scott David Smith (born 6 March 1975 in Christchurch) is a New Zealand former football (soccer) defender.

He has played for the New Zealand national football team, the All Whites, making his debut in 1998 against Chile and collecting his 28th and final cap (no goals scored) in official FIFA matches against France in the Confederations Cup 2003.

Smith began the 2006-07 campaign back at Isthmian League side Kingstonian, but was released and went on to play for Bisley Sports in the Hellenic League.

References

External links 

Scott Smith Basingstoke Town Profile

1975 births
Living people
Rotherham United F.C. players
English Football League players
Kettering Town F.C. players
Woking F.C. players
Kingstonian F.C. players
New Zealand association footballers
New Zealand international footballers
Association footballers from Christchurch
Association football defenders
New Zealand expatriate association footballers
Expatriate footballers in England
New Zealand expatriate sportspeople in England
1999 FIFA Confederations Cup players
2000 OFC Nations Cup players
2002 OFC Nations Cup players
2003 FIFA Confederations Cup players